Chesmensky (masculine), Chesmenskaya (feminine), or Chesmenskoye (neuter) may refer to:
Chesmensky District, a district of Chelyabinsk Oblast, Russia
Chesmensky (rural locality), a rural locality (a lighthouse) in Arkhangelsk Oblast, Russia
Chesmenskaya Church
Chesmensky Palace
Chesmensky (honorific), a Russian noble honorific surname earned after the Battle of Chesma. It may refer to:
Alexei Grigoryevich Orlov-Chesmensky
Anna Orlova-Chesmenskaya
 (1763-1820), Russian major-general

See also
 Chesma (disambiguation)